Maria Deroche (21 July 1938 – 25 January 2023) was a Brazilian-born French architect.

Biography
Born in São Paulo on 21 July 1938, Deroche studied at the Faculty of Architecture and Urbanism, University of São Paulo and graduated in 1963. She had studied alongside brutalist architects Paulo Mendes da Rocha and Vilanova Artigas.

The couple left in 1985 and co-founded the Atelier d'urbanisme et d'architecture Jean et Maria Deroche. In 1990, she signed the Appel des 250 calling for opposition to the rise of the National Front.

Maria Deroche died on 25 January 2023, at the age of 84.

References

1938 births
2023 deaths
French women architects
University of São Paulo alumni
Brazilian emigrants to France
People from São Paulo